Simon and Ted McDermott became famous together in 2016 when Simon McDermott supported his father Ted McDermott to produce songs under his artist's name Songaminute Man in 2016.

Ted McDermott had been a professional singer in clubs and had been given the nickname "The Songaminute Man" by fans for his ability to sing any song perfectly on command.

Later, he began to lose his memory due to Alzheimer's disease. He was first diagnosed with Alzheimer's in 2013 at the age of 77, and his son Simon decided to give up his marketing career in London to return to Blackburn to help his mother care for his father. He then realized, starting with songs such as "Quando Quando Quando", that he could reach out to his father by singing songs together with him, and that his father sang the songs in perfect tune. Simon subsequently uploaded videos in the style of carpool karaoke of his singing with his father on YouTube, which quickly became popular on the Internet.

Their cooperation led to international media acclaim and raised awareness and funds for causes relating to Alzheimer's patients.

Their work has led to the publication of a first single "You Make Me Feel So Young" / "Quando Quando Quando" with Decca Records, the publication of an album in 2017, of which 25% of the returns from sales are dedicated to the Alzheimer's Society to fund research into dementia, and a book in 2018. By 2018, they had raised over £250,000 for the Alzheimer's Society.

Simon McDermott documented their path in the book The Songaminute Man, recounting his father's life as well as his experience of caring for his father.

Ted's second album "Swing on Jupiter and Mars" was released as a limited edition CD in December 2021 on The Songaminute Man website. The tracks were recorded during the 2020 and 2021 lockdowns in the Covid-19 pandemic.

Awards 
Simon and Ted McDermott received a Special Recognition award of the Pride of Britain Awards in 2016. Simon McDermott was awarded JustGiving's 'Creative Fundraiser of the Year Award' in 2016.

In 2017, Simon McDermott won the 'Fundraiser of the Year' (Individual) Award at the Alzheimer's Society 'Dementia Friendly Awards' ceremony.

In 2018, Simon and Ted McDermot also won a Mano Amiga Award.

Book 
 Simon McDermott, The Songaminute Man. How Music Brought My Father Home Again, HarperCollins Publishers, 2018.

References 

British pop singers
British jazz singers
20th-century British male singers
21st-century British male singers
Alzheimer's disease